Cristina Iglesias (born 1956) is a Spanish installation artist and sculptor living and working in Torrelodones, Madrid. She works with many materials, including steel, water, glass, bronze, bamboo, straw. On January 20, 2016 she was awarded the Tambor del Oro in San Sebastian. Iglesias was the first Spanish woman invited to exhibit her work at the Folkestone Triennial in 2011. She is the sister of Academy Award-nominated film composer Alberto Iglesias.

Early life and education 
Iglesias was born in San Sebastián, Northern Spain in 1956. She commenced a degree in Chemical Sciences at Universidad del País Vasco in 1976 before out in 1978 to practise ceramics and drawing in Barcelona. In 1980, she moved to London to study Sculpture at the Chelsea College of Art in London where she met her husband, Juan Muñoz and other artists such as Anish Kapoor.

Exhibitions 

Iglesias began exhibiting in the 1980s and has since taken part in over 60 individual and group exhibitions in Europe, North America and Japan.

Solo exhibitions

Group exhibitions

Awards 
Iglesias was honoured with the National Award for Plastic Arts in 1999. She was also awarded the Berliner Kunstpreis in 2012.

References 

1956 births
Living people
20th-century Spanish women artists
21st-century Spanish women artists
Spanish sculptors
Spanish contemporary artists